The House at 712 N. Mill Street in Fayetteville, Arkansas, is a particularly fine local example of Craftsman/Bungalow style architecture.  Built c. 1914, it is a -story wood-frame structure, set on a foundation of rusticated concrete blocks.  The walls are finished in novelty siding, and there is a shed-roof porch extending across most of its front, supported by slightly tapered box columns mounted on concrete piers.  The area under the porch includes exposed rafter ends.  A gable-roof dormer with three sash windows pierces the roof above the porch.

The house was listed on the National Register of Historic Places in 1992.

See also
National Register of Historic Places listings in Washington County, Arkansas

References

Houses on the National Register of Historic Places in Arkansas
Houses completed in 1914
Houses in Fayetteville, Arkansas
National Register of Historic Places in Fayetteville, Arkansas
1914 establishments in Arkansas
American Craftsman architecture in Arkansas
Bungalow architecture in Arkansas